Patricia Wartusch was the defending champion but lost in the second round to Mariana Díaz Oliva.

Paola Suárez won in the final 6–4, 6–2 against Rita Kuti-Kis.

Seeds
A champion seed is indicated in bold text while text in italics indicates the round in which that seed was eliminated. The top two seeds received a bye to the second round.

  Paola Suárez (champion)
  Corina Morariu (second round)
  Ángeles Montolio (second round)
  Tathiana Garbin (first round)
  Marta Marrero (first round)
  Rita Kuti-Kis (final)
  Sylvia Plischke (first round)
  Anabel Medina Garrigues (first round)

Draw

Final

Section 1

Section 2

References
 2001 Copa Colsanitas Draw

Copa Colsanitas
2001 WTA Tour